Semiricinula bozzettii is a species of sea snail, a marine gastropod mollusk, in the family Muricidae, the murex snails or rock snails.

Description
The length of the shell attains 17.4 mm.

Distribution
This marine species occurs off Madagascar.

References

External links
 Houart, R.; Héros, V. (2013). Description of new Muricidae (Mollusca: Gastropoda) collected during the Atimo Vatae expedition to Madagascar “Deep South". Zoosystema. 35(4), 503-523

bozzettii
Gastropods described in 2013